Garards Fort is an unincorporated community in Greene County, Pennsylvania, United States. Garards Fort has a post office, with ZIP code 15334. Garards Fort is known for the Revolutionary era Corbly Family massacre.

References

Unincorporated communities in Greene County, Pennsylvania
Unincorporated communities in Pennsylvania